Iowa Highway 85 (Iowa 85) is a short state highway in east-central Iowa.  The route begins at the eastern city limit of Montezuma and ends at Iowa 21 east of Deep River.  Created in 1920 as a spur route connecting What Cheer to Primary Road No. 2, it is an original route in the Iowa primary highway system.  In the early 1930s, the route was extended north to Deep River and west to Montezuma.  By the end of the decade, Iowa 21 had taken over the north–south portion of the route.  Except for both endpoints shifting slightly, Iowa 85 has largely stayed the same since the 1930s.

Route description
Iowa 85 begins at the eastern city limit of Montezuma. It heads east through the rolling farmland of Poweshiek County. Near the midpoint of the route, it intersects County Road V18 (CR V18). As it approaches Deep River, the route briefly curves to the north-northeast before turning to the southeast. The terrain becomes hillier as the route crosses a creek leading to the eponymous river just north of Deep River. On the south side of Deep River, Iowa 85 turns back to the east.

History
Primary Road No. 85 was created in 1920 with the advent of Iowa's primary highway system.  At the time, it was a short spur route connecting What Cheer to Primary Road No. 2 in Keokuk County.  In 1931, Iowa 85 was significantly lengthened north to Deep River and west to US 63 in Montezuma.  In 1939, the route was shortened to its east–west section between Montezuma and Deep River as Iowa 21 was extended and it supplanted Iowa 85 south of Deep River.

Iowa 85 was paved in the mid-1950s; until then, the highway had been a gravel road.  In the early 1960s, Iowa 21 was straightened through Keokuk County near Guernsey and Deep River.  This caused the eastern end of Iowa 85 to move east back to the point where it had turned into an east–west route in the 1930s.  The route would remain this way for nearly thirty years.  In 1994, the westernmost  of Iowa 85 was turned over to the City of Montezuma.  The route now begins at the eastern city limits.  Along US 63, signs at the former intersection of Iowa 85 now say "To Iowa 85".

Major intersections

References

085